The 1913 Chicago Cubs season was the 42nd season of the Chicago Cubs franchise, the 38th in the National League and the 21st at West Side Park. The Cubs finished third in the National League with a record of 88–65.

Offseason 
 December 15, 1912: Joe Tinker, Grover Lowdermilk and Harry Chapman were traded by the Cubs to the Cincinnati Reds for Red Corriden, Bert Humphries, Pete Knisely, Mike Mitchell and Art Phelan.

Regular season

Season standings

Record vs. opponents

Roster

Player stats

Batting

Starters by position 
Note: Pos = Position; G = Games played; AB = At bats; H = Hits; Avg. = Batting average; HR = Home runs; RBI = Runs batted in

Other batters 
Note: G = Games played; AB = At bats; H = Hits; Avg. = Batting average; HR = Home runs; RBI = Runs batted in

Pitching

Starting pitchers 
Note: G = Games pitched; IP = Innings pitched; W = Wins; L = Losses; ERA = Earned run average; SO = Strikeouts

Other pitchers 
Note: G = Games pitched; IP = Innings pitched; W = Wins; L = Losses; ERA = Earned run average; SO = Strikeouts

References

External links
1913 Chicago Cubs season at Baseball Reference

Chicago Cubs seasons
Chicago Cubs season
Chicago Cubs